John John may refer to:

 John-John Dohmen (born 1988), Belgian field hockey player
 John John Florence (born 1992), American surfer
 John John Jesse (born 1969), American illustrative painter
 John John Mnyika, Tanzanian politician
 John John Molina (born 1965), Puerto Rican boxer
 John F. Kennedy Jr. (1960-1999), nicknamed John-John